The tornado outbreak of March 6–7, 2017 was a widespread severe weather and tornado outbreak that affected portions of the Midwestern United States in the overnight hours of March 6–7. Occurring just days after a deadly and more significant event across similar areas just a week prior, this particular outbreak led to 63 tornadoes within a 9-hour period as a quasi-linear convective system and discrete supercell thunderstorms traversed the region. The most notable aspect of the outbreak was an EF3 tornado that damaged or destroyed hundreds of structures within Oak Grove, Missouri, injuring 12 people but causing no fatalities. An EF1 tornado touched down near Bricelyn, the earliest known tornado on record in the state of Minnesota. Outside of tornadic activity, hundreds of damaging wind reports and a multitude of severe hail reports were documented.

Meteorological synopsis
On March 2, the Storm Prediction Center (SPC) highlighted the forecast evolution of an upper-level trough and the potential for severe thunderstorms across portions of the southern Plains and the lower Mississippi River Valley valid for day 5/March 6. However, limited moisture return and low forecaster confidence prevented the delineation of a severe weather threat area at that time. The organization again omitted a threat area for the same period the next day, citing unpredictability in the duration and severity of strong thunderstorms. On March 4, the SPC outlined a Marginal risk of severe weather from northeastern Texas northward into extreme portions of southern Minnesota and southwestern Wisconsin. The next morning, a Slight risk was introduced across portions of northeastern Oklahoma, southeastern Kansas, much of Missouri, and northwestern Arkansas. Accounting for increased confidence in supercellular thunderstorm development ahead of a quasi-linear convective system (QLCS), a small Enhanced risk of severe weather was indicated across portions of northwestern Arkansas and southern Missouri during the afternoon hours of March 5. This risk area was expanded the day of the event, including a 10% hatched tornado probability area across southeastern Kansas and south-central Missouri where the SPC noted, "large hail and tornadoes, some of which may be significant, will be the primary risks with any supercells that can maintain discrete mode immediately ahead of a probable QLCS."

On the heels of a significant tornado outbreak that affected much of the same areas the week before, this event came to fruition as a synoptic upper-level trough tilted northwest to southeast from the Alaska Panhandle into the Four Corners region. A strong shortwave trough on the base of the synoptic feature was expected to phase with a second shortwave over Utah, collectively progressing across the northern and central Plains throughout March 6. The northern half of the trough, meanwhile, was expected to evolve into a closed low in the middle levels of the atmosphere as it lifted into The Dakotas and then on up to southern Canada. At the surface, a rapidly-deepening area of low pressure (expected to fall to near  by 00:00 UTC on March 7) was noted across South Dakota, with a cold front extending southward into New Mexico and a warm front extending eastward into the Great Lakes region. A dry line extended from central South Dakota down to northern Mexico. Both the cold front and the dry line were expected to track eastward throughout the day, with the former feature expected to overtake portions of the latter in eastern Kansas by the evening hours. Despite widespread low-level clouds in the warm sector, limiting the amount of atmospheric instability, mid-level Convective Available Potential Energy (CAPE) values were expected to rise to around 2000 J/kg across the western Ozarks and up to 500 J/kg as far north as north-central Minnesota. Partially modified Gulf moisture, with dewpoints in the 60s F across the Enhanced risk and 50s F farther north, was expected to combine with steep mid-level lapse rates of 7–7.5 C/km to destabilize the environment.

Although a capping inversion across the risk area limited convection throughout the day and despite the main forcing passing north of the highest risk area, two regimes were expected to evolve: a quasi-linear convective system along the cold front and the formation of discrete supercells ahead of said line. With strong effective bulk wind shear up to 65–75 mph (100–120 km/h), effective storm relative helicity of 250–400 m2/s2, and even higher 0–1 km storm relative helicity values of 500–600 m2/s2, the environment became primed for a widespread severe weather and tornado outbreak. The first tornado watch of the day was issued at approximately 17:55 UTC across portions of Iowa, and several other watches were also issued across the Midwest before the final watch issued for portions across the Mid-South expired at 16:00 UTC on March 7. In total, the SPC logged 35 filtered reports of tornadoes, 352 filtered reports of damaging winds, and 98 filtered reports of severe hail. A vast majority of tornadoes that occurred during this outbreak were spawned by semi-discrete supercell structures and embedded mesovortices within a larger quasi-linear convective system, as development of true discrete supercell thunderstorms throughout the event was somewhat limited. However, a few isolated supercell thunderstorms did develop over northern Arkansas and southern Missouri during the late night hours of March 6 into the early morning hours of March 7. One of these isolated supercells produced a long-track EF2 tornado that struck Parthenon, Arkansas and caused heavy damage. The most significant event of the outbreak was an EF3 tornado that moved directly through Oak Grove, Missouri, damaging or destroying hundreds of structures and injuring 12 people. No fatalities occurred as a result of this outbreak, but 19 people were injured.

Confirmed tornadoes

March 6 event

March 7 event

See also
 Tornadoes of 2017
 Tornado outbreak of February 28 – March 1, 2017 – A tornado outbreak that affected portions of the same area a week prior

Footnotes

References

External links
Outbreak summaries from regional National Weather Service offices:

Topeka, Kansas, WFO
Little Rock, Arkansas, WFO
Springfield, Missouri, WFO
Kansas City, Missouri, WFO
Des Moines, Iowa, WFO
Twin Cities, Minnesota, WFO
La Crosse, Wisconsin, WFO
Quad Cities, IA/IL, WFO
Saint Louis, Missouri, WFO
Central Illinois, WFO

2016–17 North American winter
2017 in Kansas
2017 in Missouri
2017 in Illinois
2017 in Iowa
2017 in Minnesota
March 2017 events in the United States
Tornadoes of 2017